Marcelo Ríos won the men's singles tennis title at the 1998 Italian Open after Álbert Costa withdrew from the final.

Álex Corretja was the defending champion, but lost in the second round to Karim Alami.

Seeds

  Pete Sampras (third round)
  Petr Korda (first round)
  Marcelo Ríos (champion)
  Patrick Rafter (first round)
  Greg Rusedski (first round)
  Yevgeny Kafelnikov (third round)
  Jonas Björkman (first round)
  Gustavo Kuerten (semifinals)
  Álex Corretja (second round)
  Karol Kučera (first round)
  Richard Krajicek (quarterfinals)
  Alberto Berasategui (semifinals)
  Félix Mantilla (second round)
  Carlos Moyà (third round)
  Michael Chang (quarterfinals)
  Cédric Pioline (second round)

Draw

Finals

Top half

Section 1

Section 2

Bottom half

Section 3

Section 4

External links
 ATP Singles draw

Men's Singles